Peter Federico González Carmona (born 25 July 2002), commonly known as Peter, is a footballer currently playing as a winger for Real Madrid Castilla. Born in Spain, he has represented the Dominican Republic at the youth level.

Club career
A youth product of Getafe Olímpico and Ciudad Getafe, Peter joined the youth academy of Real Madrid in 2015. He made his professional debut with Real Madrid in a 2–1 La Liga win over Athletic Bilbao on 22 December 2021.

International career
Born in Spain to Dominican parents, He represented the Dominican Republic U15s in the 2017 CONCACAF U15 Championship, with a goal in 3 appearances.

Career statistics

Club
.

Honours 
 Real Madrid Juvenil A
 UEFA Youth League: 2019–20
 Real Madrid
 La Liga: 2021–22

References

External links
Real Madrid profile

2002 births
Living people
Footballers from Madrid
Dominican Republic footballers
Spanish footballers
Spanish people of Dominican Republic descent
Sportspeople of Dominican Republic descent
Association football midfielders
Association football forwards
Segunda División B players
Primera Federación players
La Liga players
Real Madrid Castilla footballers
Real Madrid CF players
Dominican Republic youth international footballers
Mixed-race Dominicans